| lowest attendance = 653 London Scottish at home to Moseley on 24 November 2012
| tries ={{#expr:
  +  6 +  7 +  3 +  5 +  3 +  6
  +  2 +  5 + 11 +  5 +  5 +  8
  +  4 +  8 +  5 +  9 +  3 +  3
  +  6 +  8 +  6 + 10 +  3 + 10
  +  4 +  5 +  7 +  2 +  8 +  7
  +  7 + 10 +  6 +  8 +  3 +  6
  +  3 +  4 +  3 +  8 +  3 +  3
  +  8 +  4 +  2 +  6 +  0 + 10
  +  6 +  4 +  4 + 10 +  7 +  6
 +  2 +  4 +  3 +  4 +  3 +  9
 +  6 +  5 +  5 +  4 +  2 + 10
 +  4 +  4 +  0 +  2 +  2 +  1
 +  6 +  5 +  4 +  4 +  5 +  7
 +  0 +  2 +  0 +  5 +  1 +  8
 +  3 +  8 +  7 +  1 +  7 +  4
 +  6 +  4 +  8 +  4 +  6 +  3
 +  9 +  2 +  2 +  7 +  6 +  7
 +  4 +  2 +  4 +  5 +  4 +  4
 +  3 +  4 +  1 +  6 + 11 + 10
 +  4 +  7 +  4 +  4 +  3 +  8
 +  7 +  3 +  8 +  4 +  5 +  8
 +  5 +  7 +  7 +  9 +  3 +  7
 +  4 +  3 +  5 +  0 +  0 +  2
}}
| top point scorer = Jimmy Gopperth(Newcastle Falcons) 298 points
| top try scorer = Matt Evans(Cornish Pirates) 14 tries
| prevseason = 2011–12
| nextseason = 2013–14
}}

The 2012–13 RFU Championship is the fourth season of the professionalised format of the RFU Championship, the second tier of English domestic rugby union competitions, played between August 2012 and May 2013.

After an appeal, last seasons champions, London Welsh were promoted to the Aviva Premiership and subsequently Newcastle Falcons relegated, due to finishing bottom of the Aviva Premiership during the 2011–12 season. On 8 May 2012 it was announced that only Bristol and London Welsh (subject to further developments) were eligible for promotion under the RFU's minimum standards criteria; London Welsh advanced to the Championship final, whilst Bristol were defeated in their semi-final by the Cornish Pirates, a club that could not meet the standards criteria. However, on 23 May, the day of the first leg of the final, the RFU announced that London Welsh would not be eligible for promotion due to "various failures". London Welsh's appeal was heard by an Independent Panel on 29 June which ruled ″... that the Exiles should be promoted on the basis that they play their home games at Oxford's Kassam Stadium and that the club meet the minimum entry criteria to the league as imposed by the Professional Game Board.″ Chief Executive Officer of the RFU, Ian Richie, subsequently announced that there would be a full review of the Minimum Standard Criteria. Esher dropped out of the Championship after being relegated to the 2013–14 National League 1 and they will be replaced by a club from the Channel Islands, Jersey who won National League 1 last season and will compete in the Championship for the first time after three consecutive promotions.

The twelve clubs in the 2012–13 Championship will also participate in the 2012–13 edition of the British and Irish Cup along with clubs from Wales, Scotland and Ireland.

On 30 August the RFU announced that, for the first time, a team coached by Mike Rayer of Bedford Blues and consisting of English Qualified Players from RFU Championship teams will play a touring team. The match took place on 17 November at Castle Park, Doncaster against the Māori All Blacks with the New Zealand team winning 52 – 21.

Structure
The Championship's structure has all the teams playing each other on a home and away basis. The play–off structure has been changed dramatically for the 2012–13 season. Previously, the top eight teams entered into a complex mixture of pool and knockout play to determine promotion to the Premiership, whilst the bottom four entered into a pool whose last–placed team was relegated to National League 1. The play–off pools have been abolished beginning with this season. On the promotion side, the knockout stage, involving two–legged semi–finals followed by a two–legged final, will remain in place. Now, the top four teams at the end of the home–and–away season qualify for the promotion play–offs which follow a 1 v 4, 2 v 3 system. There will be no relegation play–offs; the bottom team will now be automatically relegated.

Competition funding 
The RFU Championship clubs were in dispute with the RFU over funding for the competition and claimed that each club was owed £77,000 for the past three seasons and will be owed a further £120,000 over the next four seasons. The clubs also believed they should have received £295,000 in 2009–10, rising to £400,000 by 2015–16 and further believed there was a breach of contract on the part of the RFU. The RFU stated that the original funding was an estimate and by 2015–16 the figure will be £359,400. On 21 August the RFU unveiled the Championship funding structure for the next four seasons to 2015–16. The funding is based on the continuation of the "English Qualified Players scheme", where clubs are required to field fifteen English qualified players in the 22-man squad on each matchday. (In previous seasons teams were required to field fourteen.) Although the amount is not given in the press release, the RFU also stated they will "increase its financial underwritings in relation to a title sponsorship while efforts continue to secure a partner".

Participating teams

Notes

League table

Regular season 
The 2012–13 RFU Championship kicked off on 31 August with Nottingham defeating Leeds Carnegie and will finish on 20 April 2013. Each team will play the other twice on a home and away basis with the top four qualifying for the promotion phase.

Round 1

Round 2

Round 3

Round 4

Round 5

Round 6

Round 7

Round 8

Round 9

Round 10

Round 11

Round 12

Round 13 

 The original result was 34 – 16 to Leeds.  However, the match went to uncontested scrums within 13 minutes on the new pitch at Headingley. A meeting of the Organising Committee of the Championship decided that the fixture should be replayed on the next available free weekend, being 1–3 February at a venue of Leeds' choice.

Round 14 

 Game postponed to 23 February 2013 after a pitch inspection (Kingston Park pitch snow-covered).

 Game postponed from 25 January due to concerns about the weather.

Round 13 replay

Round 15 

 Game postponed to 15 March 2013 due to a water-logged pitch at Billesley Common.

Round 16 

 Match postponed as the pitch was deemed unplayable.

Round 14 catch up 

 Game rescheduled from 25 January 2013.

Round 17

Round 18

Round 15 and 16 catch up 

 Game rescheduled from 9 February 2013.

 Game rescheduled from 16 February 2013.

Round 19 

Postponed due to heavy overnight snowfall in Bedfordshire. Game rescheduled to 17 April.

Postponed due to heavy snow in Birmingham. Game rescheduled to 5 April.

Postponed due to snowfall at Rotherham. Game rescheduled to 10 April.

Round 20

Round 19 postponed games 

Postponed from 23 March due to heavy snow in Birmingham.

Postponed from 23 March due to snowfall at Rotherham.

Round 21

Round 19 postponed game 

Postponed from 23 March due to heavy overnight snowfall in Bedfordshire.

Round 22

Play–offs

Semi–finals
The semi–finals followed a 1 v 4, 2 v 3 system - with the games being played over two legs and the higher placed team deciding who played at home in the first leg.

Newcastle Falcons finished the regular season in first place and played fourth-placed finishers Leeds Carnegie, with both matches being shown on SkySports. The other semi–final was between second placed Nottingham and Bedford who finished third.

Following the findings of an independent audit report, Leeds Carnegie, Newcastle Falcons and Nottingham Rugby met the "Minimum Standards Criteria" (MSC), and were eligible for promotion to the 2013–14 Aviva Premiership should they win the RFU Championship. Bedford Blues failed to meet the MSC but have the right to an appeal.

First leg

Second leg

 Bedford Blues won 49 – 38 on aggregate.

 Newcastle Falcons won 34 – 30 on aggregate.

Final

 Newcastle Falcons won 49 – 33 on aggregate and are promoted to the Aviva Premiership.

Total attendances

Top scorers

Top points scorers

Top try scorers

RFU Championship XV

The RFU Championship fielded a representative team for the first time against the Maori All Blacks, a touring team from New Zealand.

 See the main article RFU Championship XV for further details.

Other tour match 
Newcastle Falcons played a match against Tonga on Tuesday 13 November 2012 winning 24 – 13.
 See 2012 end-of-year rugby union tests for details.

Season records

Team
Largest home win – 56 pts
63 – 7 Nottingham at home to Bristol on 4 November 2012
Largest away win – 40 pts
53 - 13 Newcastle Falcons away to Moseley on 6 October 2012
Most points scored – 63 pts
63 – 7 Nottingham at home to Bristol on 4 November 2012
Most tries in a match – 9
Nottingham at home to Bristol on 4 November 2012
Most conversions in a match – 9
Nottingham at home to Bristol on 4 November 2012
Most penalties in a match – 7 (x3)
London Scottish at home to Rotherham Titans on 2 September 2012
Bedford Blues away to Newcastle Falcons on 29 April 2013
Newcastle Falcons at home to Bedford Blues on 29 April 2013
Most drop goals in a match – 2 (x2)
Rotherham Titans away to Cornish Pirates on 11 November 2012
Bedford Blues away to Newcastle Falcons on 8 March 2013

Player
Most points in a match – 29
 Gary Law for Rotherham Titans at home to Jersey on 22 September 2012
Most tries in a match – 3 (x6)
 Matt Evans for Cornish Pirates away to Jersey on 1 September 2012
 Allister Hogg for Newcastle Falcons away to London Scottish on 8 September 2012
 James Stephenson for Bedford Blues at home to London Scottish on 15 September 2012
 Charlie Hayter for Moseley away to Jersey on 15 September 2012
 Phil Burgess for Cornish Pirates at home to Rotherham Titans on 11 November 2012
 Johny Harris for Nottingham at home to Plymouth Albion on 3 March 2013
Most conversions in a match – 9
 James Arlidge for Nottingham at home to Bristol on 4 November 2012
Most penalties in a match —  7 (x3)
 James Love for London Scottish at home to Rotherham Titans on 2 September 2012
 Jake Sharp for Bedford Blues away to Newcastle Falcons on 29 April 2013
 Jimmy Gopperth for Newcastle Falcons at home to Bedford Blues on 29 April 2013
Most drop goals in a match —  2 (x2)
 Gary Law for Rotherham Titans away to Cornish Pirates on 11 November 2012
 Mark Atkinson for Bedford Blues away to Newcastle Falcons on 8 March 2013

Attendances
Highest – 7,651
Newcastle Falcons at home to Bedford Blues on 29 May 2013
Lowest – 653
London Scottish at home to Moseley on 24 November 2012
Highest Average Attendance – 4,855
Bristol
Lowest Average Attendance – 971
Moseley

See also
 2012–13 British and Irish Cup
 2012–13 Cornish Pirates RFC season

References

External links 
 RFU Championship news

 
2012–13 in English rugby union leagues
2012-13